Curtuișeni is a commune in Bihor County, Crișana, Romania with a population of 3,780 people. It is composed of two villages, Curtuișeni and Vășad (Érvasad).

At the 2011 census, 63.3% of inhabitants were Hungarians, 22.5% Romanians and 14.1% Roma.

References

Communes in Bihor County
Localities in Crișana